Garrigatitan (meaning "garrigue giant") is a genus of titanosaurian dinosaur from the late Cretaceous Period of the Grès à Reptiles Formation in France. The genus contains a single species, Garrigatitan meridionalis.

Discovery and naming
Between 2009 and 2012, excavations were carried out at Velaux-La Bastide Neuve by the Palaios Association and the University of Poitiers. During the excavations, the holotype of Garrigatitan was discovered along with the remains of Atsinganosaurus, another titanosaurian.

In 2021, the type species Garrigatitan meridionalis was named and described by Verónica Díez Díaz, Géraldine Garcia, Xabier Pereda Suberbiola, Benjamin Jentgen-Ceschino, Koen Stein, Pascal Godefroit and Xavier Valentin. The holotype, MMS / VBN.09.17, was found in a layer of sandstone of the Begudian, the second level of the second series, dating back to the late Campanian. It consists of a sacrum  belonging to an immature individual.

Additional fossil material has been assigned to the species including a cervical vertebra, two humeri, a left ilium, and a right ischial bone. Other specimens recovered include a neural spine, a right humerus, part of the right leg, and a left femur. The assigned specimens come from the third level of the second series. They were not associated and presumably represent different individuals. They are all part of the Moulin Seigneurial de Velaux collection.

The generic name, "Garrigatitan," is a combination of the Occitan "garriga," meaning "dry thicket", referring to a type of Mediterranean vegetation characterized by drought-resistant shrubs, and the Greek "titan", after the Greek mythological family of giants. The specific epithet, "meridonalis," means "southern" in Latin, in reference to the discovery location in southern France.

Description

Classification
Cladistic analysis of Garrigatitan shows that it belonged to the subfamily Lirainosaurinae.

References 

Titanosaurs
Late Cretaceous dinosaurs of Europe
Campanian life
Cretaceous France
Fossils of France
Fossil taxa described in 2021